James Stosic (born 22 September 1981 in New Plymouth, New Zealand) is a former professional rugby league footballer who last played for the Easts Tigers in the Queensland Cup.

Early years
A Waitara Bears junior, Stosic attended New Plymouth Boys High School and represented Taranaki in 1998 as a 17-year-old alongside his brother Sasho. He attended New Plymouth Boys High. That year Stosic made the New Zealand Secondary School team and the New Zealand 18 years Academy Team. He played for the Academy team at the Under 19s Oceania Tournament and was named the forward of the tournament.

Playing career
Stosic previously Wakefield Trinity Wildcats in the Super League competition. He is of Macedonian descent.

Stosic signed for Wakefield Trinity Wildcats on 10 November 2008. Since then, he has played in 4 Super League matches for the Wildcats, before injuring his leg during the Wildcats victory over Warrington Wolves in round 4. He was out of action for 12 weeks.

Representative career
In 1999 he toured Papua New Guinea with the New Zealand Māori side.

He was named in the Serbian training squad for the 2009 European Cup.

References

External links
Cronulla Sharks profile
NRL profile
Stosic signs for Wildcats
Prop Stosic could leave Wakefield

1981 births
Living people
Cronulla-Sutherland Sharks players
Eastern Suburbs Tigers players
Gold Coast Titans players
New Zealand expatriate sportspeople in Australia
New Zealand Māori rugby league players
New Zealand Māori rugby league team players
New Zealand people of Macedonian descent
New Zealand people of Serbian descent
New Zealand rugby league players
Rugby league players from New Plymouth
Rugby league props
Taranaki rugby league team players
Waitara Bears players
Wakefield Trinity players